Curia Mountain is a summit situated between Clairvaux Creek and Meadow Creek in Banff National Park, Alberta, Canada.

Curia Mountain was so named due to its curia-like (a Roman-era Senate house) outline.

References

Three-thousanders of Alberta
Alberta's Rockies
Mountains of Banff National Park